Jesse Puljujärvi (born 7 May 1998) is a Swedish-born Finnish professional ice hockey player for the Carolina Hurricanes of the National Hockey League (NHL). Rated as a top prospect, Puljujärvi was drafted fourth overall by the Edmonton Oilers in the 2016 NHL Entry Draft.

Playing career

Kärpät
Puljujärvi played in the 2011 Quebec International Pee-Wee Hockey Tournament with the Finland Selects youth team.

Puljujärvi began his hockey career and Fin-Jr. league debut in 2013–14 with the Kärpät Jr. hockey team. In the two seasons he participated in, Puljujärvi recorded 23 points in 18 games and 18 points in 11 games.

Puljujärvi made his Liiga debut playing with Kärpät during the 2014–15 Liiga season. Leading up the NHL draft, he was ranked as the number three European skater. He was described as a big, mobile, skilled, an all-around winger who can score and pass.

Puljujärvi was sent down mid-season and made his Mestis debut in 2014–15 with Kärpät affiliate Kajaanin Hokki. He finished the season with 13 points in 15 games. During the season, Puljujärvi was considered good enough again, that he was sent to the Kärpät hockey team to continue his career there. Kärpät would be his final team before he would be drafted into the NHL.

In 2015–16, his first full season with Kärpät, Puljujärvi played in 50 Liiga games, scoring 28 points (13 goals and 15 assists), as well as in ten playoff games with four goals and five assists. He also competed in the Champions Hockey League (CHL) with the club, recording 2 assists in 13 games but remained goalless.

Puljujärvi would then leave the team and European hockey altogether, as he would be drafted into the NHL as the fourth overall pick by the Edmonton Oilers.

Edmonton Oilers
Puljujärvi signed a three-year, entry-level contract with the Edmonton Oilers on 13 July 2016. He opted to wear sweater #98 with the team, making him the first NHL player to do so since 1985, when Brian Lawton wore the number in a regular season game. But he later chose to change his number to #13 for the 2020-2021 season with the Edmonton Oilers. After making the Oilers opening night roster for the 2016–17 season, he made his NHL debut on opening night with the Oilers in which he scored his first career NHL goal on 12 October 2016.

After just 28 games, Puljujärvi was sent down to the Oilers' American Hockey League (AHL), the affiliate Bakersfield Condors, for more development time. During his tenure at the AHL, Puljujärvi scored 12 goals and 16 assists in 39 games.

Puljujärvi returned to the Oilers in the 2016–17 NHL season but ultimately bounced between the NHL and AHL squads. On 20 January 2018, Puljujärvi registered a career-high three-point game, recording one goal and two assists against the Vancouver Canucks. This would also mark the first time Puljujärvi received a first star for a game.

He returned to Oulun Kärpät in August 2019, signing an initial one-year contract, though the Edmonton Oilers would hold his NHL rights.

On 7 October 2020, after a year of holding out from the Oilers organization, Puljujärvi was signed to a two-year, $2.35 million contract with the Oilers. He remained with Kärpät on loan until the commencement of the delayed 2020–21 NHL season.

As a restricted free agent following the 2021–22 season, Puljujärvi avoided arbitration with the Oilers after re-signing to a one-year, $3 million contract extension on 26 July 2022.

Carolina Hurricanes
Approaching the NHL trade deadline, Puljujärvi was dealt by the Oilers to the Carolina Hurricanes in exchange for Patrik Puistola on 28 February 2023.

International play

Puljujärvi helped team Finland win silver medal at the 2015 IIHF World U18 Championships in Switzerland.

Puljujärvi played for Finland at the 2016 World Junior Championships, where they won gold on 5 January 2016. In seven games, he scored 5 goals and 12 assists for 17 points, placing him second in all-time points for an under-18 player behind only Jaromír Jágr, and tying Wayne Gretzky and Eric Lindros. He was subsequently declared Best Forward and Most Valuable Player of the tournament. Later that year, Puljujärvi was also a part of the national team at the 2016 World U18 Championships, winning another gold medal, becoming the first and so far the only European player to win a U20 and U18 gold medal in the same year.

Personal life
Puljujärvi was born to Finnish parents in Sweden and lived there until he was four, though culturally, he identifies as Finnish. He holds both Finnish and Swedish citizenship. In his free time, he likes playing ice hockey with neighbourhood kids. During his time in Edmonton he got nicknamed The Bison King, after posting an image on social media of himself giving a thumbs up, while a bison is behind him.

Career statistics

Regular season and playoffs

International

Awards and honors

References

External links
 

1998 births
Living people
Bakersfield Condors players
Carolina Hurricanes players
Edmonton Oilers draft picks
Edmonton Oilers players
Finnish ice hockey right wingers
Hokki players
National Hockey League first-round draft picks
Oulun Kärpät players
People from Älvkarleby Municipality
Swedish people of Finnish descent